The Critics' Choice Movie Award for Best Actress is an award given out at the annual Critics' Choice Movie Awards. The awards are presented by the Broadcast Film Critics Association (BFCA), and was first presented in 1995. There were no official nominees announced until 2001. There are currently six nominees annually, and there have been three ties in this category (2008, 2009, 2018). Cate Blanchett, Jessica Chastain, Frances McDormand, Julianne Moore, Natalie Portman, Meryl Streep, and Hilary Swank are the only actresses who have received this award more than once, with two wins each.

This is the main Best Actress award for leading performances by an actress. Previously, two other genre-specific categories were presented: Best Actress in a Comedy (from 2012 to 2019); and Best Actress in an Action Movie (from 2012 to 2016).

For the Supporting Actress category, see Critics' Choice Movie Award for Best Supporting Actress.

Winners and nominees

1990s

2000s

2010s

2020s

Multiple nominees

2 nominations
 Amy Adams
 Emily Blunt
 Sandra Bullock
 Olivia Colman
 Angelina Jolie
 Lady Gaga
 Brie Larson
 Julianne Moore
 Carey Mulligan
 Natalie Portman
 Margot Robbie
 Hilary Swank
 Naomi Watts
 Kate Winslet
 Reese Witherspoon
 Renée Zellweger

3 nominations
 Annette Bening
 Jessica Chastain
 Marion Cotillard
 Viola Davis
 Judi Dench
 Jennifer Lawrence
 Frances McDormand
 Michelle Williams

4 nominations
 Saoirse Ronan

5 nominations
 Charlize Theron

6 nominations
 Cate Blanchett
 Nicole Kidman
 Meryl Streep

Multiple winners
3 wins
 Cate Blanchett

2 wins
 Jessica Chastain
 Frances McDormand
 Julianne Moore
 Natalie Portman
 Meryl Streep (consecutive)
 Hilary Swank

See also
 Academy Award for Best Actress
 Independent Spirit Award for Best Female Lead
 BAFTA Award for Best Actress in a Leading Role
 Golden Globe Award for Best Actress in a Motion Picture – Drama
 Golden Globe Award for Best Actress – Motion Picture Comedy or Musical
 Screen Actors Guild Award for Outstanding Performance by a Female Actor in a Leading Role

References

External links
 Critics' Choice Movie Awards (official site)

A
Film awards for lead actress
Awards established in 1995